Turá is a village and municipality in the Levice District in the Nitra Region of Slovakia.

History
In historical records the village was first mentioned in 1264.

Geography
The village lies at an altitude of 154 metres and covers an area of 9.286 km². It has a population of about 240 people.

Ethnicity
The village is about 62% Magyar and 38% Slovak.

Facilities
The village has a public library and football pitch.

External links
http://www.statistics.sk/mosmis/eng/run.html

Villages and municipalities in Levice District